The year 1861 in architecture involved some significant architectural event and new buildings.

Buildings and structures

Buildings completed

 Arlington Street Church in Boston, Massachusetts, United States, designed by Arthur Gilman.
 St James the Less, Pimlico, London, designed by George Edmund Street.
 All Saints Notting Hill, London, designed by William White in 1852.
 St. Michael's Church, Berlin, designed by August Soller (who is buried here) in 1845 and completed by Richard Lucae (his nephew), Andreas Simons and Martin Gropius.
 Tromsø Cathedral, Norway, designed by Christian Heinrich Grosch.
 Palácio do Grão-Pará, Petrópolis, Brazil, designed by Theodore Marx with de Araújo Porto Alegre.
 Mary Birdsall House in Richmond, Indiana.

Awards
 RIBA Royal Gold Medal – Jean-Baptiste Lesueur.
 Grand Prix de Rome, architecture: Constant Moyaux.

Births

 January 6 – Victor Horta, Belgian architect and designer (died 1947)
 April 20 – Hermann Muthesius, German architect and writer on architecture (died 1927)
 July 17 – Horace Field, English architect (died 1948)
 September 2 – Arthur Beresford Pite, English architect (died 1934)

Deaths
 May 15 – Benjamin Woodward, Irish architect (born 1816)
 October 13 – Sir William Cubitt, English civil engineer (born 1785)

References

Architecture
Years in architecture
19th-century architecture